Darvesh Pind  is a village in Phagwara Tehsil in Kapurthala district of Punjab State, India. The village is administrated by a Sarpanch, who is an elected representative.

Demography 
According to the report published by Census India in 2011, Drawesh Pind has 381 houses with the total population of 1,891 persons of which 957 are male and 934 females. Literacy rate of Drawesh Pind is 71.26%, lower than the state average of 75.84%.  The population of children in the age group 0–6 years is 193 which is 10.21% of the total population.  Child sex ratio is approximately 930, higher than the state average of 846.

Population data 

As per census 2011, 677 people were engaged in work activities out of the total population of Drawesh Pind village which includes 566 males and 111 females.  According to census survey report 2011, 52.73% workers (Employment or Earning more than 6 Months) describe their work as main work and 47.27% workers are involved in Marginal activity providing livelihood for less than 6 months.

Caste 
The village has schedule caste (SC) constitutes 66.68% of total population of the village and it does not have any Schedule Tribe (ST) population.

References

External links
  Villages in Kapurthala
 Kapurthala Villages List

Villages in Kapurthala district